"A Quality of Mercy" is episode 80 of the American television anthology series The Twilight Zone, which originally aired on December 29, 1961. The title is taken from a notable speech in William Shakespeare's The Merchant of Venice, quoted in Serling's closing narration at the end of the episode.

Opening narration

Plot
On August 6, 1945, Second Lieutenant Katell has just arrived at the Pacific Ocean theater of World War II, and he orders his war-weary soldiers to make a desperate attack on a group of sick and wounded Japanese soldiers holed up in a cave. Seasoned veteran Sergeant Causarano tries to talk him out of it as he knows that the men have had enough of war and that attacking the cave would be pointless, only wasting lives on both sides. Intent on proving himself and earning his rank, Katell refuses to listen and stands firm on his orders. He berates the platoon for their lack of enthusiasm and the men reluctantly prepare for the assault.

Katell then accidentally drops his binoculars. When he goes to retrieve them, he finds himself in Corregidor fighting in the Imperial Japanese Army as a Japanese man named Lt. Yamuri. The year is now 1942, and he is ordered to attack a group of sick and wounded American soldiers who are holed up in a cave. Having found a new perspective, he tries in vain to dissuade the captain from the attack, arguing that the Americans inside the cave pose no threat and can be bypassed.

The Japanese captain bluntly refuses to listen, suspecting that the young man is either sick with jungle fever or has lost his nerve to fight. He tells Yamuri to straighten up or stay with the wounded, but Yamuri does not back down. The captain then relieves him of command and moves the company forward to begin the attack anyway, coldly disinterested in anything but destroying the other side.

Katell then finds himself back in 1945 as an American soldier. His men tell him that they've just gotten word that the atomic bomb has been dropped. They have been ordered not to attack the cave, but instead to fall back and wait to see how Japan responds. Causarano sardonically assures him "Well, I wouldn't fret. There'll be other caves, and other wars, other human beings you can knock off." As the platoon withdraws, Katell says to himself "I hope not. God help us, I hope not."

Closing narration

Cast
 Dean Stockwell as Lt. Katell/Lt. Yamuri
 Albert Salmi as Sgt. Causarano
 Rayford Barnes as Andrew J. Watkins
 Ralph Votrian as Hanacheck
 Leonard Nimoy as Hansen
 Dale Ishimoto as Sergeant Yamazaki
 J. H. Fujikawa as Japanese Captain

Production
This episode was filmed on a sound stage at Hal Roach Studios, instead of the usual MGM facilities.

The episode's writer, Rod Serling, served as a paratrooper in the Philippines during World War II.

References

Bibliography
 DeVoe, Bill (2008). Trivia from The Twilight Zone. Albany, GA: Bear Manor Media. .
 Grams, Martin (2008). The Twilight Zone: Unlocking the Door to a Television Classic. Churchville, MD: OTR Publishing. .
 Zicree, Marc Scott (1982). The Twilight Zone Companion. Sillman-James Press, 1982 (2nd edition).

External links

 
 

1961 American television episodes
Fiction set in 1942
Fiction set in 1945
Television episodes about time travel
Television episodes about World War II
Television episodes written by Rod Serling
The Twilight Zone (1959 TV series season 3) episodes